The Hohmädli (2,021 m) is a mountain of the Bernese Alps, located north of Oberwil in the canton of Bern. It lies east of the Widdersgrind, on the range between the valleys of Morgete and Simmental.

References

External links
Hohmädli on Hikr.org

Mountains of the Alps
Mountains of Switzerland
Mountains of the canton of Bern
Two-thousanders of Switzerland